Italia metro station is located in Catania in Sicily, southern Italy. It is served by the Catania Metro.

References

External links

Catania Metro stations
Railway stations opened in 1999
1999 establishments in Italy
Railway stations in Italy opened in the 20th century